The 1940 Preston by-election was a parliamentary by-election held for the British House of Commons constituency of Preston in Lancashire on 29 September 1940.  The seat had become vacant on the death of the Conservative Member of Parliament Adrian Moreing, who had held the seat since the 1931 general election.

During World War II, the parties in the war-time coalition government had agreed not to contest by-elections where a seat held by any of their parties fell vacant, so the Conservative candidate, Randolph Churchill (son of Prime Minister Winston Churchill), was returned unopposed.  He represented the constituency until his defeat at the 1945 general election.

See also 
Preston (UK Parliament constituency)
Preston, Lancashire
1903 Preston by-election
1915 Preston by-election
1929 Preston by-election
1936 Preston by-election
1946 Preston by-election
2000 Preston by-election
List of United Kingdom by-elections

Preston by-election
Preston by-election
By-elections to the Parliament of the United Kingdom in Lancashire constituencies
Unopposed by-elections to the Parliament of the United Kingdom (need citation)
Elections in Preston
1940s in Lancashire
Preston by-election